Philippe Pozzo di Borgo (born 14 February 1951) is a Corsican French businessman who is the Director of Pommery and was the owner of an inherited historic hôtel particulier in Paris used as a function hall.

Biography 
Philippe is the second son of the French duke Pozzo di Borgo and the Marquis de Vogue. The noble family dates back to the 1500s. After completing his education, he began working in the champagne industry. Prior to his job as director of Pommery, Philippe was a manager at Moët and Chandon.

Philippe di Borgo became a diabetic quadriplegic in 1993 following a paragliding accident. Because of his disability, he attempted to commit suicide by wrapping an oxygen tube around his neck.

In popular culture
The story of Philippe and his Algerian attendant, Abdel Sellou,  was told in a 2003 documentary, A la vie, à la mort. Their story was also adapted in the biographical movies The Intouchables (2011), and the Indian, Argentine, and American re-makes, respectively,  Oopiri (2016), (Spanish article) Inseparables (2016),  and The Upside (2017). These movies were based on his memoir, "A Second Wind".

References

People from Corsica
French businesspeople
People with tetraplegia
Living people
1951 births